Shankill GAA is a Gaelic Athletic Association club in based in the Shankill area in the south of County Dublin.  The club was reformed in 2013.  To date the club has an adult men's  and ladies' team football along with boys' and girls' teams at underage at various levels.

Origins

Shankill Shilmaliers

The earliest known existence of a Shankill team was on November 5, 1911, a Sunday. Very little is known before this date. The club was known as Shankill Shilmaliers. The name Shilmalier taken from the barony of Shilmalier Co.Wexford, a place associated with the 1798 rebellion.

In July 1910 a newly formed newspaper called the Saturday Dublin Post published Dublin's first match reports and minutes of County Board Meetings. Dublin GAA and Ireland at the time were in hectic circles. The Post did reporting on behalf of all organisations during a political atmosphere hostile to the fostering of Irish culture.

Here are extracts of the Post involving Shankill Shilmaliers.

Sunday November 5, 1911 at the Phoenix ParkFoxrock Geraldines and Shankill Shilmaliers teams lined out to play their match, and from the start the ball was more often out of play than in. The players kept at it, however, for 40 minutes, but a very heavy shower coming on, their ardour cooled a little, and they sought the shelter of the trees. The Referee deemed it unwise to continue the game. Shilmaliers were leading by 1 goal 1 point to 1 point. About 1 minute before half time a player of the Shankill team named Jas McGarry was seriously injured as a result of accidentally colliding with an opponent. It was decided in full view of the circumstances to refix the match to be played for the full time at Shankill on Sunday. Mr J J Clare to Referee.

The Replay Played On Sunday November 12, 1911 at People's Park, Bray

At the weekly meeting of the football league Mr J J Clare(Referee) reported that junior tie between Shankill Shilmaliers and Foxrock Gerarldines was fixed at the last meeting to be played in Shankill, but as the ground there was not available, both teams travelled on to the People's Park Bray to play the match. After 40 minutes play the match was abandoned for want of a ball, 2 balls having been burst. The scores at the time: Foxrock 1-1 Shankill 1 point. Mr Clare further reported that a Foxrock player named Joseph Seville retired seriously injured through accidentally colliding with an opponent.

2nd Replay On Sunday November 26, 1911 at Kill-O-The -Grange

The much played game between Foxrock Gers and Shankill Shilmaliers was finally decided on Sunday at Kill-O-the-Grange. It will be recollected that the teams met twice before in the Phoenix Park and the People's Park Bray, when after forty minutes play on each occasion the game had to be abandoned, owing to the storm on the first occasion and in consequence of the ball bursting on the second occasion. Last Sundays match, however, settled the matter, as the Foxrock men won by 2 goals to 1 goal 1 point.

Football League Meeting December 11, 1911 - Shankill Objection To Foxrock

The First objection taken up was the Shankill Shilmaliers objection to Foxrock Gers (B) team, which played them in a league tie at Kill-O-The-Grange, the grounds of the objection being, the Foxrock team played six players who played against Clan Lir in October. After the objection had been read, Mr J J Clare said he was not going to defend it, as the players were illegal. The committee could give the points to Shankill. The chairman ruled accordingly and points were awarded to Shankill.

References

Gaelic games clubs in Dún Laoghaire–Rathdown
Gaelic football clubs in Dún Laoghaire–Rathdown